Jiří Tichý (6 December 1933 – 26 August 2016) was a Czech football player.

During his club career he played for CH Bratislava and Sparta Prague. Tichý won three championship titles with Sparta. He earned 19 caps for the Czechoslovakia national football team, and was part of the second-placed team at the 1962 FIFA World Cup.

References

 

1933 births
2016 deaths
Czech footballers
Czechoslovak footballers
Czechoslovakia international footballers
1962 FIFA World Cup players
FK Inter Bratislava players
AC Sparta Prague players
People from Prague-West District
1960 European Nations' Cup players
Association football defenders
Sportspeople from the Central Bohemian Region